Glynfach (Welsh for 'small valley') is a district of the community and electoral ward of Cymmer, within the town of Porth, Rhondda Cynon Taf. There are no shops in Glynfach, however there is one pub - The Colliers Arms - and one parish church - St. John's Church. Glynfach consists of only a handful of streets, most of which are terraces.

Adjoining Glynfach is the small district of Britannia.  Glynfach was also once the location of Glynfach Colliery, sunk in 1851.

External links 
 The Colliers Arms
 St John's Church

Villages in Rhondda Cynon Taf